At least three United States Navy ships have been named USS Raritan, after the Raritan River in New Jersey.

  was a sailing frigate launched in 1843
  was a harbor tug, commissioned into the United States Coast Guard in 1939, transferred to the Navy in 1941, transferred back to the Coast Guard in 1946, and decommissioned in 1988
  was a landing ship commissioned in 1945 and decommissioned in 1959

United States Navy ship names